Neocollyris pinguis is a species of ground beetle in the genus Neocollyris in the family Carabidae. It was described by Horn in 1894.

References

Pinguis, Neocollyris
Beetles described in 1894